Tote Ireland is an Irish gambling company headquartered in The Curragh, County Kildare which is the largest pool betting operator in Ireland. Its main product is sports betting. Founded in 1932, it has responsibility for the operation of Tote retail outlets across all 26 racecourses in Ireland. Since 1945, it has been owned by Horse Racing Ireland, formerly known as the Racing Board. In April 2020, Tote Ireland entered into a seven-year strategic partnership with British gambling company, The Tote.

History
In 1929 the Totalisator Act was passed for mechanical pool betting in Ireland, with the Totalisator borrowing 20,000IR punts from sponsored races. Its first meeting in Fairyhouse on the April 21, 1930, offered win and place betting from 35 windows and had a Tote turnover of 5,035IR punts. By the end of 1930, with its best meetings at Punchestown, The Curragh, Galway and Tramore, the Tote had sold million tickets at 87 race meeting amassing 100,000IR punts.
In 1932 Tote Account was established, accepting bets by telegram. Also that year Tote attracted investors to the company and seven years later in 1939 slot machines were introduced, operating a single machine for each horse. By their end in 1965 they had sold 60 million tickets.
1945 saw the forming of the Racing Board and in 1966 the Tote Jackpot Bet was introduced.
In 1978 a syndicate arranged for a manipulation of the queues at Mullingar Greyhound Stadium to prevent all but a few bets on the likely winner of a race, so as to maximise the tote payout on that winner. Many bookmakers at the time paid "Tote odds". The syndicate placed small bets in bookie's shops across the country on the favourite. The resulting loss to the trade, due to the odds of 945/1, would have totalled hundreds of thousands of pounds but many refused to payout. A Garda investigation was concluded without charges.
In 1987 computerised terminals were introduced and the IHA (Irish Horseracing Authority) was formed in 1994.
In 1999 the Tote launched their self-service Touch Tote Terminals and only a year later in 2000 they took an amazing 1 million IR punts turnover for a single days racing, at the Galway festival on August 3, 1999. This record was broken at Galway in 2003 and once again in 2005, surpassing all previous records with a single race days take reaching 1,914,558.05.
In 2001 Tote commenced co-mingling into UK Tote pools and in 2004 table service betting was introduced. Online wagering was introduced on the December 14, 2005.

Tote Pools
Tote Ireland operates the following pools:
 Win - Runner must finish first.
 Place - Runner must finish within the first two places (in a 5-7 runner race), three places (8-15 runners and non-handicaps with 16+ runners) or four places (handicaps with 16+ runners).  (From 23 April 2000 to 23 May 2010, Tote Ireland operated 4-place betting on ALL races with 16 or more runners.)
 Each-way - Charged and settled as one bet to win and another bet to place (for example, a punter asking for a bet of "five euro each way" will be expected to pay ten euro.)
 Jackpot - Pick the winners of races 3-6.
 Pick Six - Pick the winners of races 1-6 (introduced on 9 January 2011).
 Placepot The bettor must correctly pick one horse to place in each of the races 1-6.
 Exacta - The bettor must correctly pick the two runners which finish first and second, in the correct order.
 Trifecta - The bettor must correctly pick the three runners which finish first, second, and third, in the correct order (introduced on 26 May 2010 replacing the Trio, which allowed the selections to be in any order).

Tote Records
Largest single Jackpot winner = €207k Leopardstown 20/11/1988
Best Winning Odds: 1177/1 Naas 30/11/1988
Best Exacta Odds: 8,107/1 Galway 01/08/2001
Largest take single race: €437,686.15 Galway 29/07/2004
Largest take single race day: €1,914,558.05 Galway 28/07/2005

References

External links
 
 Bet Guide

Bookmakers